The Croquet Association, which was formed as the United All England Croquet Association in 1897, is the national governing body for the sport of croquet in England. Until 1974 the association was responsible for croquet in the whole of the United Kingdom. The Scottish Croquet Association, formed in 1974, now has responsibility for croquet in Scotland. At the 2013 AGM the association formally relinquished control of the game in the other parts of the United Kingdom.

Presidents of the association have included Sir Compton Mackenzie, who was President from 1953 to 1966. The association controls the rules of the game, in conjunction with the croquet associations of Australia, New Zealand and the United States. It also controls the regulations of tournaments for its member clubs. The Open Championship (association) of croquet originally dates back to 1867, but after a hiatus during the years 1883-1896 was reintroduced by the Croquet Association. This and the Golf Croquet Open Championship are the premier events in the UK of each code.

Competitions

Association Croquet competitions
The President's Cup was introduced in 1901, though at the time it was known as the Beddow Cup, named after A.E.Beddow, the trophy's donor. The President's Cup was an invitational rather than an open competition, and was contested between the top ten (now eight) croquet players chosen by the Croquet Association. The original cup became the property of Miss Dorothy Dyne Steel in 1933 after she won the competition for a record fourth time. A new cup was required for the 1934 competition and one was presented by then president, Trevor Williams, the competition being known as the President's Cup from that date.

In 2001, the Open Championship was combined with the World Championship.

Singles competitions

Doubles competitions

Golf Croquet competitions
The Golf Croquet First Eight is also an invitational competition contested between the top eight croquet players chosen by the Croquet Association. First held in 2008, players originally competed for the Musk's Cup, but was replaced by the Ricki Savage Memorial Trophy as the tournament was no longer sponsored by Musks.

The English National Singles Championship is a competition for which players gain places through qualification by performing well in certain other events throughout the season. In the current format, there are eight qualification tournaments in which both finalists qualify for the 16-player final, held at the end of the season. These eight qualifiers make up what is called the Championship Series, which are chosen by the Croquet Association as the eight consistently strongest Championship events (apart from the Open Championship). 

In 2004, the Open Championship was combined with the World Championship.

Presidents

References

Notations
 Croquet Records maintained by Mr C. Williams

External links
 The Croquet Association - Home Page
 The Scottish Croquet Association
 The Welsh Croquet Association

Croquet in the United Kingdom
Organisations based in Cheltenham
Sports governing bodies in the United Kingdom
1897 establishments in the United Kingdom
Sports organizations established in 1897